Michael Zalewski may refer to:

Michael J. Zalewski, member of the Illinois General Assembly 
Michael R. Zalewski (born 1956), City of Chicago alderman 
Michał Zalewski (born 1981), computer security expert 
Mike Zalewski (born 1992), American ice hockey player